Gura may refer to:

Places

Eritrea
Gura, Eritrea, a formerly-important town of the Ottoman, Egyptian, Ethiopian, and Italian Empires

India
Gura Sonigara, small village in Rajasthan, India
Gura, Nakodar, small village in Punjab, India
Gura, Jalandhar, a village in Jalandhar district of Punjab, India

Iran
Gura, Iran, a village in Alborz Province
Vargun Gura, village in Ardabil Province

Kenya
Gura, Kenya, a sub-location of Othaya town in Nyeri  County
Gura River, River Gura is located in Nyeri County of Central Province of Kenya. It is the fastest flowing river in Africa. It flows from the Aberdare Ranges and passes through Othaya, Tetu and Mukurweini  Constituencies before draining into the Sagana (Upper Tana).
Gura Waterfall, the most precipitous fall in Kenya, which cascades 300m into an impenetrable ravine

Moldova
Gura Bîcului, commune in Anenii Noi district
Gura Camencii, commune in Floreşti district
Gura Căinarului, commune in Floreşti district
Gura Galbenei, commune in Cimişlia district
Gura-Oituz, village in Cotiujenii Mici village, Sîngerei district

Pakistan
Gura Balial, village in the Kotli District of Azad Kashmir

Romania
Gura Humorului, town in Suceava County
Gura Caliței, commune in Vrancea County
Gura Foii, commune in Dâmboviţa County
Gura Ialomiței, commune in Ialomiţa County
Gura Ocniței, commune in Dâmboviţa County
Gura Padinii, commune in Olt County
Gura Râului, commune in Sibiu County
Gura Șuții, commune in Dâmboviţa County
Gura Teghii, commune in Buzău County
Gura Vadului, commune in Prahova County
Gura Văii (disambiguation), several places
Gura Vitioarei, commune in Prahova County
Gura Arieșului, village in Lunca Mureșului Commune, Alba County
Gura Albești, village in Albești Commune, Vaslui County
Gura Bărbulețului, village in Bărbulețu Commune, Dâmboviţa County
Gura Bâscei, village in Cislău Commune, Buzău County
Gura Beliei, village in Breaza town, Prahova County
Gura Bohotin, village in Gorban Commune, Iaşi County
Gura Bordului, village in Lunca Cernii de Jos Commune, Hunedoara County
Gura Călmăţui, village in Berteştii de Jos Commune, Brăila County
Gura Câlnăului, village in Vadu Pașii Commune, Buzău County
Gura Căluiu, village in Călui Commune, Olt County
Gura Crăieşti, village in Motoșeni Commune, Bacău County
Gura Crivățului, village in Mănești Commune, Prahova County
Gura Crucilor, village in Dănicei Commune, Vâlcea County
Gura Cuțului, village in Vințu de Jos Commune, Alba County
Gura Dimienii, village in Beceni Commune, Buzău County
Gura Dobrogei, village in Cogealac Commune, Constanţa County
Gura Făgetului, village in Topliceni Commune, Buzău County
Gura Gârbovăţului, village in Ghidigeni Commune, Galați County
Gura Gârluţei, former village in Berteştii de Jos Commune, Brăila County
Gura Haitii, village in Șaru Dornei Commune, Suceava County
Gura Idrici, village in Roșiești Commune, Vaslui County
Gura Izbitei, village in Bucium Commune, Alba County
Gura-Menţi, village in Borăscu Commune, Gorj County
Gura Motrului, village in Butoiești Commune, Mehedinţi County
Gura Pravăţ, village in Valea Mare-Pravăț Commune, Argeș County
Gura Putnei, village in Putna Commune, Suceava County
Gura Racului, village in Bulzești Commune, Dolj County
Gura Roșiei, village in Roșia Montană Commune, Alba County
Gura Sărăţii, village in Merei Commune, Buzău County
Gura Siriului, village in Siriu Commune, Buzău County
Gura Sohodol, village in Sohodol Commune, Alba County
Gura Solcii, village in Grănicești Commune, Suceava County
Gura Suhașului, village in Ocnele Mari town, Vâlcea County
Gura Şuşiţei, village in Ionești Commune, Gorj County
Gura Vulcanei, village in Vulcana-Pandele Commune, Dâmboviţa County
Gura Dobrogei River, tributary of the Casimcea River
Gura Văii River, tributary of the Cremene River
Gura Voii River, tributary of the Geoagiu River
Slănic de Gura Ocniței River or Slănic River, tributary of the Ialomiţa River
Gura Ocniței oil field, giant oil field located in Gura Ocniţei, Dâmboviţa County

Other uses
Gura (surname)
Gawr Gura

See also
Tona-Gura!, Japanese manga series